Chinnor Rugby Football Club is an English rugby union club based in Thame, Oxfordshire. They currently play in the third tier of the English league system, National League 1 following their promotion from National League 2 South via the promotion play-off at the end of the 2017–18 season. The club regularly runs five senior teams as well as a full youth setup from age 5 upwards. Chinnor's youth setup is widely thought of as one of the best in the country having produced top Premiership players such as Tom Varndell (Leicester Tigers), Tom Johnson (Exeter Chiefs), Dave Seymour (Saracens), Paul Volley (Wasps), and Sam Jones (Wasps). Chinnor became the first club in Oxfordshire or Buckinghamshire to establish an under-19 academy.

History
Chinnor RFC was formed in 1962 and played their first game the following year. The 1970s saw the club expand to include junior and youth teams and in 1976 the club won the Oxfordshire Cup. When the English league system started the club was placed in Bucks and Oxon Division 1 and have progressed through the Southern Counties section to gained promotion to the National Leagues in 2006; the youngest club to do so. The club gained a further promotion from National League 3 South West in 2012.

During the 2016–17 National League 2 South season, the club achieved a record attendance at Kingsey Road of 1,580 during a top of the table clash against Bishop's Stortford, a game Chinnor won 27–25.

Honours
1st team:
 Oxfordshire RFU County Cup winners (5): 1977, 1999, 2002, 2010, 2011
 Bucks/Oxon 1 champions: 1994–95
 South West 2 East champions: 2000–01
 South West 1 champions (2): 2005–06, 2007–08
 Oxfordshire Cup winners (3): 2010, 2011, 2012
 National League 3 (south-east v south-west) promotion play-off winner: 2011–12
 National League 2 (north v south) promotion play-off winner: 2017–18

2nd team:
 Berks/Bucks & Oxon Premier A champions: 2005–06
Oxfordshire RFU County Cup winners (2): 2012, 2013

3rd team:
 Berks/Bucks & Oxon 1 champions (2): 2005–06, 2016–17

Current standings

References

External links
 Official website

English rugby union teams
Rugby clubs established in 1962
Rugby union in Oxfordshire
Thame